Sand Church is a parish church of the Church of Norway in Suldal Municipality in Rogaland county, Norway. It is located in the village of Sand. It is the church for the Sand parish which is part of the Ryfylke prosti (deanery) in the Diocese of Stavanger. The white, wooden church was built in a long church design in 1852 using designs by the architect Hans Linstow. The church seats about 450 people.

History

The earliest existing historical records of the church date back to the year 1283, but it was not new that year.

Around the year 1600, the old stave church was torn down and replaced with a timber-framed building on the same site. After the new church was completed, the old church was torn down. The old church grounds were converted into a cemetery.

See also
List of churches in Rogaland

References

Suldal
Churches in Rogaland
Wooden churches in Norway
19th-century Church of Norway church buildings
Churches completed in 1852
12th-century establishments in Norway